Ángel Álvarez (26 September 1906 – 13 December 1983) was a prolific Spanish film actor.

He made over 205 film appearances between 1945 and 1982. He is probably best known for his western films of the 1960s and 1970s. He appeared in Spaghetti Western films such as Navajo Joe, and Django in 1966 opposite Franco Nero. He often played a plump store keeper or a bank manager.

Selected filmography

 Eloisa Is Under an Almond Tree (1943) - Espectador del cine (uncredited)
 El destino se disculpa (1945) - Conserje de la radio (uncredited) 
 La luna vale un millón (1945) - Financiero (uncredited)
 Cinco lobitos (1945)
 Unknown Path (1946) - Barman
 El crimen de Pepe Conde (1946)
 María Fernanda, la Jerezana (1947)
 Fuenteovejuna (1947)
 Don Quixote (1947) - Segundo Fraile (Second Friar) (uncredited)
 Anguish (1947) - Bibliotecario
 El marqués de Salamanca (1948) - Recepcionista hotel
 Pequeñeces... (1950) - criado de Jacobo
 Tiempos felices (1950)
 Our Lady of Fatima (1951) - (uncredited)
 The Great Galeoto (1951)
 Lola the Coalgirl (1952) - Parroquiano (uncredited)
 Cerca de la ciudad (1952) - Juan
 Facultad de letras (1952) - Camarero
 From Madrid to Heaven (1952) - Cochero
 Devil's Roundup (1952) - Cajero
 Last Day (1952) - Dueño de la churrería
 Doña Francisquita (1952) - Un señor (uncredited)
 El encuentro (1952)
 Welcome Mr. Marshall! (1953) - Pedro
 I Was a Parish Priest (1953) - Tendero (uncredited)
 Nadie lo sabrá (1953) - Compañero de Pedro
 Airport (1953) - Lorenzo
 Adventures of the Barber of Seville (1954) - Dueño de la posada (uncredited)
 Three are Three (1954) - (segment "Introducción: Tribunal")
 Tres huchas para Oriente (1954) - Cliente de José
 Nosotros dos (1955) - Customer (uncredited)
 El coyote (1955)
 Duelo de pasiones (1955)
 Mañana cuando amanezca (1955) - Karl Naumann
 Noche de tormenta (1955)
 The Red Fish (1955) - Portero del teatro
 Recluta con niño (1956) - Marido de Enriqueta
 The Coyote's Justice (1956) - Fiscal
 La vida en un bloc (1956) - Cura párrroco (uncredited)
 The Big Lie (1956) - Guionista de Sándalo (uncredited)
 Esa voz es una mina (1956)
 Miedo (1956)
 We're All Necessary (1956) - Cocinero restaurante del tren
 We Thieves Are Honourable (1956) - Farmacéutico
 Andalusia Express (1956) - Apostador en frontón (uncredited)
 El malvado Carabel (1956) - Olalla
 Manolo guardia urbano (1956) - Dueño de la mantequería (uncredited)
 Miracle of the White Suit (1956) - Tabernero
 Piedras vivas (1956)
 Miguitas y el carbonero (1956)
 Dimentica il mio passato (1957)
 El hombre que viajaba despacito (1957) - Marcelino
 Un abrigo a cuadros (1957)
 Faustina (1957) - Guardia (uncredited)
 El genio alegre (1957)
 Fulano y Mengano (1957) - Encargado de obra
 Un marido de ida y vuelta (1957) - Sacerdote
 Polvorilla (1957)
 Las muchachas de azul (1957) - Payaso
 Historias de Madrid (1958) - Lucas
 The Tenant (1958) - Consejero
 Familia provisional (1958)
 Aquellos tiempos del cuplé (1958) - Don Benigno
 El hombre del paraguas blanco (1958) - El boticario
 Vengeance (1958) - Amo 2
 Muchachas en vacaciones (1958)
 Villa Alegre (1958) - Ramiro
 El Pisito (1959) - Sáenz
 El puente de la paz (1958) - Vecino
 Ana dice sí (1958) - Portero
 Los clarines del miedo (1958) - Músico
 Hospital general (1958)
 Die Sklavenkarawane (1958) - Bimbaschi (uncredited)
 Where Are You Going, Alfonso XII? (1959) - Tabernero (uncredited)
 Soledad (1959)
 Juego de niños (1959)
 Gayarre (1959) - Mecenas
 Bombas para la paz (1959) - Padre de la novia citada a las 11
 Luxury Cabin (1959) - Padrino
 Salto a la gloria (1959) - Fotógrafo
 Y después del cuplé (1959)
 They Fired with Their Lives (1959)
 La vida alrededor (1959) - Don Heliodoro
 Der Löwe von Babylon (1959) - Kepek
 El día de los enamorados (1959) - Cliente en Tienda de Deportes
 El gafe (1959)
 Los chicos (1959) - (uncredited)
 El secreto de papá (1959)
 Legions of the Nile (1959)
 El amor que yo te di (1960)
 Siempre en la arena (1960)
 El cerro de los locos (1960) - Don Daniel
 Juanito (1960)
 Carnival Day (1960)
 The Fabulous Fraud (1960) - Pascual
 Compadece al delincuente (1960)
 Le tre eccetera del colonnello (1960)
 La quiniela (1960)
 El Cochecito (1960) - Álvarez
 The Two Rivals (1960)
 One Step Forward (1960) - Cocinero
 My Street (1960) - Tratante de caballos (uncredited)
 091 Policía al habla (1960) - Melonero
 La estatua (1961)
 Margarita se llama mi amor (1961) - Manolo, hombre sentado en el baile
 La bella Mimí (1961)
 Prohibido enamorarse (1961) - El burrero
 Darling (1961)
 Honorables sinvergüenzas (1961) - Roque Martínez Calero
 Despedida de soltero (1961)
 Tres de la Cruz Roja (1961) - Don José
 Armas contra la ley (1961)
 Fray Escoba (1961) - Fray Tomás
 Zorro the Avenger (1962) - Ciudadano
 Accidente 703 (1962) - Mariano (uncredited)
 Los que no fuimos a la guerra (1962) - Fernández
 Sabían demasiado (1962)
 The Balcony of the Moon (1962) - Cura
 Una isla con tomate (1962)
 Cupido contrabandista (1962)
 La gran familia (1962) - El frutero
 Les quatre vérités (1962)
 Operación Embajada (1963) - Anticuario
 La becerrada (1963) - Chamorro
 El sol en el espejo (1963) - Frutero
 The Executioner (1963) - Álvarez, el enterrador
 La máscara de Scaramouche (1963)
 A Nearly Decent Girl (1963) - Guía Don Quijote
 Marisol rumbo a Río (1963) - Cliente en gasolinera
 Pacto de silencio (1963) - Cap. Esteban Durante
 Júrame (1964)
 I promessi sposi (1964)
 Isidro el labrador (1964)
 The Chosen Ones (1964) - Aldeano en tren
 Weeping for a Bandit (1964) - Cliente de la posada
 Fin de semana (1964) - Don Eloy
 Damned Pistols of Dallas (1964) - Fast Draw
 Tintin and the Blue Oranges (1964) - le Professeur Zalamea
 The Pleasure Seekers (1964) - (uncredited)
 Tres dólares de plomo (1964)
 La frontera de Dios (1965)
 Historias de la televisión (1965)
 Currito of the Cross (1965) - Don Antonio
 El cálido verano del Sr. Rodríguez (1965)
 Mi canción es para ti (1965) - Don Napoleón
 Madamigella di Maupin (1966) - Monseigneur de Maupin
 Rose rosse per Angelica (1966)
 Django (1966) - Nathaniel the Bartender
 Navajo Joe (1966) - Oliver Blackwood - Bank Manager
 Non faccio la guerra, faccio l'amore (1966)
 Eroe vagabondo (1966)
 Fury of Johnny Kid (1967) - Padre
 El hombre de Caracas (1967)
 Operación Dalila (1967) - Botín
 Las 4 bodas de Marisol (1967) - Sacerdote #1
 El Baldiri de la costa (1968) - Rector
 Requiem for a Gringo (1968) - Samuel, Saloon Owner
 The Mercenary (1968) - Notary (uncredited)
 Cemetery Without Crosses (1969) - Barkeeper (uncredited)
 Pasto de fieras (1969)
 Esa mujer (1969)
 Mi marido y sus complejos (1969) - Ernesto
 Educando a una idiota (1969)
 The Price of Power (1969) - J. B. Cotton
 El alma se serena (1970) - Taxista
 Adiós, Sabata (1970) - Bookie (uncredited)
 Préstame quince días (1971) - Arturo
 Una chica casi decente (1971)
 Delusions of Grandeur (1971) - (uncredited)
 Rain for a Dusty Summer (1971) - The Bishop (uncredited)
 La montaña rebelde (1971) - Don Fabián
 En un mundo nuevo (1972) - Taxista
 Ligue Story (1972) - El párroco
 Sting of the West (1972)
 A Reason to Live, a Reason to Die (1972) - Scully the Monger (uncredited)
 Secuestro a la española (1972)
 The Scarlet Letter (1973) - Rev. Wilson
 ¡Qué cosas tiene el amor! (1973) - Miembro del rodaje
 Corazón solitario (1973) - Sacerdote
 Ricco the Mean Machine (1973) - Giuseppe Calogero
 Verflucht, dies Amerika (1973)
 Celos, amor y Mercado Común (1973)
 Grandeur nature (1974) - Spaniard at party (uncredited)
 Los caballeros del Botón de Ancla (1974) - Don Cristino
 El reprimido (1974)
 Doctor, me gustan las mujeres, ¿es grave? (1974) - Médico
 El insólito embarazo de los Martínez (1974) - Hombre en combate de boxeo
 Vida íntima de un seductor cínico (1975)
 Nosotros, los decentes (1976) - Don Domingo
 El alijo (1976) - Agente
 Ligeramente viudas (1976)
 Guerreras verdes (1976) - Sacerdote
 The Anchorite (1976) - Álvarez
 La mujer es un buen negocio (1977) - Cliente del limpiabotas
 Viaje al centro de la Tierra (1977) - Professor
 Uno del millón de muertos (1977)
 Nunca es tarde (1977) - Abuelo
 Doña Perfecta (1977)
 Hail Hazana (1978) - Hermano Pedro
 Avisa a Curro Jiménez (1978)
 La escopeta nacional (1978)
 Cabo de vara (1978)
 Soldados (1978)
 Tigers in Lipstick (1979)
 El rediezcubrimiento de México (1979) - Cura
 Un pasota con corbata (1982)
 Nacional III (1982)
 Un rolls para Hipólito (1982) - Huésped #2
 Los pajaritos (1983)

References

External links 

 

Spanish male film actors
Male Spaghetti Western actors
Male actors from Madrid
1906 births
1983 deaths
20th-century Spanish male actors